Atascosa County is a county located in the U.S. state of Texas. It is in South Texas and its county seat is Jourdanton.

As of the 2020 United States Census, its population was 48,981.  Atascosa County is part of the San Antonio-New Braunfels metropolitan statistical area.

History
In 1856, the Texas Legislature established Atascosa County from portions of Bexar County and named it for the Atascosa River.

Geography

The county contains rolling hills and knolls, sloped to the southeast. It is drained by the Atascosa River, which exits the county at its southeast corner. The highest point is a localized hill near the northeast border with Bexar County, between Lytle and Somerset in Bexar, at 810 ft (247 m) above sea level.

Major highways

  Interstate 35
  Interstate 37
  U.S. Highway 281
 
  State Highway 16
  State Highway 85
  State Highway 97

Adjacent counties

 Bexar County - north
 Wilson County - northeast
 Karnes County - east
 Live Oak County - southeast
 McMullen County - south
 La Salle County - southwest
 Frio County - west
 Medina County - northwest

Demographics

As of the 2010 United States census,  44,911 people resided in the county; 84.9% were White, 0.8% Black or African American, 0.8% Native American, 0.3% Asian, 0.1% Pacific Islander, 10.9% of some other race, and 2.3% of two or more races. About 61.9% were Hispanics or Latinos (of any race).

As of the 2000 United States census, 38,628 people, 12,816 households, and 10,022 families were in the county. The population density was 31/sqmi (12/km2). The 14,883 housing units had an average density of 12/sqmi (5/km2). The racial makeup of the county was 73.23% White, 0.60% African American, 0.80% Native American, 0.31% Asian,  21.6% from other races, and 3.47% from two or more races. About 58.56% of the population were Hispanics or Latinos of any race.

Of the 12,816 households, 41.7% had children under 18 living with them, 60.3% were married couples living together, 13.0% had a female householder with no husband present, and 21.8% were not families. About 18.9% of all households were made up of individuals, and 8.7% had someone living alone who was 65 or older.  The average household size was 2.99, and the average family size was 3.41.

The age distribution was 31.7% under 18, 8.9% from 18 to 24, 27.6% from 25 to 44, 21.0% from 45 to 64, and 10.8% who were 65 or older. The median age was 32 years. For every 100 females, there were 96.60 males. For every 100 females 18 and over, there were 94.20 males.

The median income for a household in the county was $33,081, and for a family was $37,705. Males had a median income of $27,702 versus $18,810 for females. The per capita income for the county was $14,276. About 16.10% of families and 20.20% of the population were below the poverty line, including 25.60% of those under age 18 and 21.70% of those age 65 or over.

Education
These school districts serve Atascosa County:

 Charlotte Independent School District (partial)
 Jourdanton Independent School District
 Karnes City Independent School District (partial)
 Lytle Independent School District (partial)
 Pleasanton Independent School District
 Poteet Independent School District
 Somerset Independent School District (partial)

Most of the county is in the service area of Alamo Community College District. The portion in Pleasanton ISD is zoned to Coastal Bend College (formerly Bee County College).

Communities

Cities
 Charlotte
 Jourdanton (county seat)
 Lytle (partly in Medina and Bexar counties)
 Pleasanton
 Poteet

Town
 Christine

Census-designated place
 Leming

Unincorporated communities

 Amphion
 Anchorage
 Black Hill
 Campbellton
 Coughran
 Crown
 Davis
 Espey
 Fashing
 Hindes
 Iuka
 Kyote
 La Parita
 McCoy
 Peggy
 Rossville
 Verdi

Ghost towns
 Ditto
 Dobrowolski
 Leal

Gallery

Politics

United States presidential election results

See also

 National Register of Historic Places listings in Atascosa County, Texas
 Recorded Texas Historic Landmarks in Atascosa County

References

External links

 Atascosa County Government
 
 Atascosa County from the Texas Almanac
 Atascosa County from the TXGenWeb Project
 "Atascosa County Profile" from the Texas Association of Counties

 
1856 establishments in Texas
Populated places established in 1856
Greater San Antonio
Majority-minority counties in Texas